Ilse Rosenthal-Schneider (25 April 1891 – 6 February 1990) was a German-Australian physicist and philosopher. She is best known for her collaboration and correspondence with physicists Albert Einstein, Max von Laue, and Max Planck. Rosenthal-Schneider earned a PhD in philosophy in 1920 at the University of Berlin, where she first met Albert Einstein. After leaving Nazi Germany and emigrating to Australia in 1938, she became a tutor in the German department at the University of Sydney in 1945 and taught history and philosophy of science. In the 1940s and 1950s, she exchanged a series of letters with Albert Einstein about philosophical aspects of physics, such as theory of relativity, fundamental constants and physical reality. She remained in contact with Einstein through correspondence until the death of Einstein in 1955. Rosenthal-Schneider contributed various articles and book reviews to the history of science journal Isis.

Notable works

Quote of a discussion with Albert Einstein, November 1919

References

Primary sources

External links
 

1891 births
1990 deaths
20th-century Australian philosophers
20th-century German physicists
20th-century Australian women scientists
20th-century Australian scientists
20th-century Australian physicists
German women physicists
Humboldt University of Berlin alumni
People from Finsterwalde
Academic staff of the University of Sydney
Australian women philosophers